The Réunion Tram Train was a planned tram-train line to run approximately 140 kilometres along the coast of Réunion. Construction of the first phase was scheduled to start in 2010, for opening in 2013. The Tram'Tiss consortium was preferred bidder for a PPP concession to develop the line. However, the project was abandoned in May 2010 due to a lack of funds.

History 

Reunion used to have a rail system opened in the 1890s and closed in the 1950s and 1960s when population and traffic congestion were less.

Overview 

The line would have operated as a hybrid of a tram and a train, with tram-like street-level stations in the towns and train-like speeds of up to 100 km/h on dedicated right of way between them.  Trains would have been capable of carrying up to 250 passengers; the route would have also been capable of carrying freight from the port.

From west to north, the projected route of the first phase (41.5 km, 26 stations) will start from St-Paul and pass through St-Denis, terminating at Roland Garros Airport in Ste-Marie.  The mountainous topography of Réunion would have required a large number of viaducts and tunnels: the first phase includes 11 major engineering structures, including a 10-kilometre tunnel and the highest railway bridge in the world. The cost was estimated to be €1.25 billion for the first phase alone. Extensions east to St-Benoît and south to St-Joseph were planned.

Future plans
In 2019 a light rail system was proposed to link Le Barachois with the airport.

See also 

 List of longest tunnels
 List of highest bridges in the world

References

External links 
 Tram Train (in French)
 La Semaly: Reunion Island - Tram-train

Rail transport in Réunion
Proposed public transport in Africa
Proposed railway lines in France